Paratomoxioda testaceiventris is a species of beetle in the genus Paratomoxioda of the family Mordellidae.

References

Mordellidae